Mill Hill is a place in the London Borough of Barnet

Mill Hill can also refer to:

Places

United Kingdom
 See List of United Kingdom locations: Mill
 Mill Hill, Barnes, a street in Barnes, London

United States
Mill Hill, Trenton, New Jersey, a neighborhood in Trenton, New Jersey
Mill Hill Historic Park, a museum complex in Norwalk, Connecticut
Mill Hill (Concord, North Carolina), historic house, home of master builder Jacob Stirewalt, listed on the U.S. National Register of Historic Places

Railway stations in the UK
Mill Hill Broadway railway station, on the Thameslink commuter line in Mill Hill, North London
Mill Hill East tube station, terminus of the single track branchline of the Northern line in North London
Mill Hill (The Hale) railway station, a former station on the Edgware, Highgate and London Railway in Mill Hill, North London and an unbuilt London Underground station
Mill Hill (Lancashire) railway station, in the Mill Hill area of Blackburn
Mills Hill railway station, near Chadderton, Greater Manchester

Ships
, a cargo steamship built in 1930, renamed SS Peebles in 1933, renamed SS Mill Hill in 1936 and torpedoed in 1940
, a Liberty ship built in 1943, renamed SS Mill Hill in 1947 and renamed SS London Vendor in 1949

Other
Mill Hill Missionaries, a society of Catholic missionaries founded in 1866